Zir Ahak (also Romanized as Zīr Āhak; also known as Zāyer, Zīrak, Zīrehak, Zīrehat, Zīreh Hak, Zirhak, and Zīr Rāh) is a village in Bu ol Kheyr Rural District, Delvar District, Tangestan County, Bushehr Province, Iran. At the 2006 census, its population was 138, in 34 families.

References 

Populated places in Tangestan County